is a Japanese professional footballer who plays as a defensive midfielder for J.League club Júbilo Iwata.

Club statistics

References

External links

Profile at Júbilo Iwata

1997 births
Living people
Japanese footballers
Association football midfielders
Senshu University alumni
J1 League players
J2 League players
J3 League players
SC Sagamihara players
Júbilo Iwata players